Sorico is a comune (municipality) in the Province of Como in the Italian region Lombardy, located about  north of Milan and about  northeast of Como.

The municipality of Sorico contains the frazioni (subdivisions, mainly villages and hamlets) Albonico, Bugiallo, and Dascio.

Sorico borders the following municipalities: Dubino, Gera Lario, Montemezzo, Novate Mezzola, Samolaco, Verceia.

Demographic evolution

Transport and Tourism
Sorico is a stopping point on the bus service that links Como to Colico via the west side of Lake Como.  It is the northern endpoint of the long-distance footpath, La Via dei Monti Lariani.

References

External links

 www.comune.sorico.co.it

Cities and towns in Lombardy